The North Fiji Basin (NFB) is an oceanic basin west of Fiji in the south-west Pacific Ocean.  It is an actively spreading back-arc basin delimited by the Fiji islands to the east, the inactive Vitiaz Trench to the north, the Vanuatu/New Hebrides island arc to the west, and the Hunter fracture zone to the south.
Roughly triangular in shape with its apex located at the northern end of the New Hebrides Arc, the basin is actively spreading southward and is characterised by three spreading centres and an oceanic crust younger than 12 .  The opening of the NFB began when a slab roll-back was initiated beneath the New Hebrides and the island arc started its clockwise rotation.
The opening of the basin was the result of the collision between the Ontong Java Plateau and the Australian Plate along the now inactive Solomon–Vitiaz subduction system north of the NFB.
The NFB is the largest and most developed back-arc basin of the south-west Pacific.  It is opening in a complex geological setting between two oppositely verging subduction systems, the New Hebrides/Vanuatu and Tonga trenches and hence its ocean floor has the World's largest amount of spreading centres per area.

There are three microplates in the NFB: New Hebrides, Balmoral Reef, and Conway Reef.

Little was known about the NFB before 1985 and in the 1970s the central part of the basin, the only mapped area, was called the North Fiji Plateau.

Margins

Vanuatu
The New Hebrides central chain stretches  from Ureparapara island, Banks Islands, in the north to Hunter island in the south.
The New Hebrides trench retreats progressively which causes the southern end the subduction zone to bend eastward.
The Australian plate subducts under Vanuatu at the New Hebrides trench which results in a complex of rifts and transforms in the NFB.  The New Hebrides island chain itself is being deformed as buoyant features such as d'Entrecasteaux Ridge and West Torres Plateau are being subducted in this process.
NFB is the product of the asymmetric back-arc opening about a hinge point at 11°S, 165°E around which the Vanuatu chain has rotated 28° clockwise during the last 6 Ma, or 6–7.5°/Ma.  This rotation has also caused rifting in the northern part of the NFB.
Vanuatu can be divided into a southern and a northern tectonic blocks separate from the western NFB block.  These blocks are separated by an extensional zone east of the islands chain.

Lau

Hunter Fracture Zone
The southern margin of the NFB is formed by the Hunter Fracture Zone and the Hunter Ridge (including Matthew and Hunter Islands, two active volcanoes).  The central spreading ridge of the NFB transects Hunter Ridge and a small spreading centre is developing south of it.  The Hunter Ridge formed  3 Ma and fossil transform faults in NFB north of the ridge are remains of a spreading ridge that was active before the Vanuatu Trench propagated south of the southern end of Vanuatu, Anatom Island.

Vitiaz Trench
The northern Melanesian arc collided with the subducted south-eastern segment of the Ontong Java Plateau 10–8 Ma.  This collision reversed the direction of subduction in the Vitiaz Trench and thus initiated the clockwise rotation of the Vanuatu arc and the opening of the NFB 8–3 Ma.

Intra-basin morphology
There are two main spreading systems in the central and southern part of the NFB: the Central Spreading Ridge and the West Fiji Rift, both with a variable spreading rate of /yr.  In the northern NFB a series of spreading centres stretches  along an east–west-trending belt (with spreading rates): the Futuna (/yr) and North Cikobia (/yr) spreading centres, and the Tripartite (/yr), South Pandora, and Hazel-Holmes ridges.  Basalts in the Central Spreading ridge are of N-MORB-type, indicative of a mature accretionary system, whereas basalts in the northern NFB have an ocean island basalt (OIB) mantle source.

Central spreading ridge
The central spreading centre of the NFB is the largest and probably the oldest back-arc basin on Earth.
It can be divided into four -long segments:

The southernmost segment (21°40'S–20°30'S) stretches   trending north–south.  It has a complicated morphology with -deep ridges separated by -deep depressions.  This makes the exact location of the spreading ridge difficult to identify, but magnetic lineations reveal its presence.  The morphology is intermediate between fast and slow spreading ridge.

A flat-topped dome reaching  is cut in half by a graben a few hundred metres wide and tens of metres deep. The dome is flanked by symmetrical grabens. V-shaped pseudofaults at the northern and southern ends are traces of the propagating ridge segment.

The N15° segment is  -long and corresponds to a change in spreading direction from north–south to N15°.  The southern part is poorly-defined with an accretion distributed over numerous small volcanoes scattered over a wide area.  A double ridge north of 17°55'S flanks a graben -wide, -deep.  A shallow massif at the northern tip is cut by a graben -wide, -deep.  This part harbours hydrothermal vents.  The N15° segment is flanked by curved grabens interpreted as fossil overlapping spreading centres.  There is a triple junction at 16°50'N.

The northern N160° segment is -long, and has three parts:

In the southern part (16°50'S–15°30'S) the spreading axis is a -deep, -wide graben flanked by near-vertical walls. It has the morphology of slow-spreading ridges with an axis cut by a -wide, -high ridge. A bend at 16°10'S offsets the ridge .

The central part (15°30'S–15°00'S) has two en echelon grabens that offset the axis .  They form a domain -long, -deep and each graben is made of -long en echelon segments.  Magmatic supply here limited to a narrow ridge separating the grabens and accretion has been mostly amagmatic for the past 1 Ma.

North of 15°N the central spreading ridge is complex with two branches forming a possible triple junction.  The western branch trending N120° is a -wide, -deep graben which cuts through older oceanic crust.  The northern branch trending N140° is a -deep ridge and forms a continuation of the N160° segment.

West Fiji Rift
The West Fiji area is dominated by a western and an eastern graben separated by a central plateau.  The western graben, -wide and -deep, is flanked by a steep western wall but a series of steps on its eastern side and is a propagating rift.  A ridge on its western side, reaching less than  bsl, is flanked by another graben, -wide and -deep.  This system of grabens and ridges, probably the southern extremity of the North Fiji fracture zone, converges in a flat area at the southern end of the western graben, -deep, that is flanked by two pseudofaults  -high.  The eastern graben, -wide and -deep, is flanked by parallel ridges and depressions over a -wide area.  In the central plateau there is a fan-shaped system of ridges and depressions, the centre of which is occupied by a -deep and -wide graben.  The sedimentary cover is thin or absent over the entire area.  Pillow basalts in both the western and eastern grabens have a composition close to the mid-ocean ridge basalt (MORB) of the central spreading ridge.

Northern North Fiji Basin
The South Pandora and Tripartite Ridges in the northern NFB are active spreading ridges with -long segments, a -wide volcanic axis, and ordered magnetic lineations running parallel to the ridge.  The ridge segments are separated by complex relay zones rather than transform faults.

The South Pandora Ridge is divided into five segments averaging  in width. The axial valley is partly obscured by faulted and rifted volcanic structures; elongated grabens are typical of slow spreading ridges with steep walls flanking a deep valley.

The Tripartite Ridge is divided into three segments oriented in different directions.  It is a very young ridge that is propagating into an older domain covered by sediments.

The inactive volcanic islands Mitre and Anuta are rejuvenated Vitiaz arc volcanoes that formed 2.2 Ma, probably as a consequence of a change in the motion of the Pacific Plate.

Tectonic evolution

100–45 Ma, after the break-up of Gondwana, a single, almost continuous arc-subduction system existed in the south-west Pacific, from Solomon Islands to New Zealand's North Island.  Today only two actively spreading back-arc basins remain in the region: Taupo–Kermadec–Tonga and Hunter–Vanuatu.  Other geological structures are remnants of island arcs and back-arc basins mostly from the Eocene and Miocene, including Vitiaz Trench and the Lau–Colville, Three Kings, and Loyalty ridges.

The Fiji–New Hebrides region is made of volcanic rock but where volcanism began is uncertain.  The region probably formed far south-west of its present location where it was subsequently rifted apart when the South Fiji Basin opened in the Early Oligocene.  From the Early Oligocene to Miocene the region was part of an arc that formed the northern margin of the Australian plate.  The NFB back-arc basin broke through this margin  12  and has since the Late Miocene rotated the New Hebrides Arc 30° clockwise and Fiji at least 100° counter-clockwise.

Today the Pacific Plate is subducting westward along the eastern margin of the NFB, the Tonga-Kermadec Trench.  The Australian Plate is subducting eastward along the western margin of the NFB, the New Hebrides Trench.  The transition between these opposed subduction systems is the Fiji Fracture Zone, a complex left-lateral succession of ridges and faults north of Fiji that extends into the North Fiji and Lau basins respectively.

Slab avalanche
Large magnitude earthquakes beneath the NFB have been attributed to a detached slab segment of the subducted Australian plate which collided with the subducting Pacific plate at a depth of   5 Ma.  The earthquakes are the result of these colliding slabs settling on the 660 km discontinuity.

Beneath Tonga at a depth of  the number of earthquakes increases dramatically while the shape of the Pacific becomes complex.  Hundreds of these earthquakes occur outside the Wadati-Benioff zone (top of slab) along a horizontal plane.
The eastward subduction of the Australian plate (together with the now-fused South Fiji plate) under NFB created the New Hebrides and south Solomon Islands.  The slab produced from this subduction stretches steeply down to  except at its southern end where it only reaches .
The north end of the slab, at the southern Rennell trough, corresponds to the sharp bend in the andesite line.
A detached slab from the east-dipping Australian plate beneath the NFB has slid eastward and collided with the west-dipping Pacific slab.
A series of unusual earthquakes below the NFB occur within several such detached slab segments.  If these segments are combined and reconstructed back to their original location at the surface, they equal both the NFB and the subducted part of the Australian plate since 12 Ma in area.

The Tonga slab is avalanching through the 660 km layer at the southern end of the New Hebrides arc and trench. The Pacific plate has been subducting at the Tonga trench for a long time which led to an accumulation of slab material at the 660 km layer south of the Vitiaz trench while the New Hebrides island arc has been pushed southward and clockwise. It also reversed the direction of subduction and opened the NFB back-arc and pushed the Vitiaz slab into the mantle and initiated the subduction at New Hebrides trench.

The slab beneath Tonga and Kermadec penetrates into the lower mantle.  It is dipping down from Tonga trench but deflects horizontally at the 660 km discontinuity.  There is a detached remnant slab beneath the Vanuatu trench.  At the Kermadec trench the Pacific plate has been subducting since 40 Ma

See also
 Geology of the Pacific Ocean
 Samoa hotspot
 South Fiji Basin

References

Notes

Sources

 
 
 
 
 
 
 
 
 
 
 
 
 
 
 
 
 
 
 
 

Back-arc basins
Oceanic basins of the Pacific Ocean